Pankuj Parashar is an Indian film and television director. Among his most-known are police-thriller Jalwa (1987) starring Naseeruddin Shah, ChaalBaaz (1989), and television detective series Karamchand (1985). He also makes television commercials, corporate films and documentaries.

Career

Parashar debuted with the Hindi comedy Ab Ayega Mazaa (1984). This was followed the next year with the television series Karamchand (1985), starring Pankaj Kapoor as lead detective Karamchand with Sushmita Mukherjee as assistant Kitti and Sanjay Gupta as the assistant director. It was broadcast on India's national television channel DD National, and it was one of India's first detective series. Sony Entertainment Television revived this serial in February 2007.

He became the first director to cast a then-art film actor Naseeruddin Shah in a commercial film, Jalwa (1987) (a remake of Beverly Hills Cop) and in his 1989 film, ChaalBaaz (a remake of Seeta Aur Geeta) got lead actress Sridevi, the Filmfare Best Actress Award. Both were big hits. Parashar's Malfunction was awarded the 1980 Filmfare Award for Best Documentary.

In the 1990s he directed the big budget film Rajkumar which had the first major computer graphic effects in a Hindi film. BBC's Tomorrows World programme interviewed Parashar for it, stating he had brought Indian graphics to the level of the west. Himalay Putra which was produced by Vinod Khanna and marked the debut of his son Akshaye Khanna. His  venture Banaras (2006), was set in Benaras city, starring Urmila Matondkar and Naseeruddin Shah as leads, and was selected for the International film festival in Goa.

Mazaa Films has been producing and directing feature films, TV serials, documentaries, corporate films and computer graphics for the last 25 years. Headed by Pankuj Parashar, Gold medalist Direction course FTII 1980, the company has won all the major awards in the country starting with the Filmfare award for the best short in 1980.

He is the life member of International Film and Television Club & International Film and Television Research Centre of Asian Academy of Film & Television.

Education 
Film & Television Institute of India (FTII), Pune
Diploma in Film Direction & Screenplay Writing. 
Jai Hind College, Mumbai
Bachelor of Commerce (Economics, Mathematics and Statistics)

Experience 

 Won the Filmfare Award for the documentary Malfunction in 1980. The film was shot at the Yerwada Mental Hospital, Pune and was part of a student exercise that won in a professional arena.
 Directed 12 feature films, including Jalwa, with Naseeruddin Shah, Chaalbaaz with Sridevi, Sunny Deol and Rajnikant, Rajkumar with Anil Kapoor and Madhuri Dixit, and Tumko Na Bhool Payenge with Salman Khan and Sushmita Sen.
 Directed the cult classic Karamchand, which still counts as India's most popular and technically proficient detective television serial.
 Introduced Akshaye Khanna with Himalaya Putra.
 Produced and directed Shakti, a 30-minute anthropological documentary on an esoteric snake cult festival in Rajasthan. The documentary was invited to the Oberhausen Film Festival and was also screened at the Berlin Film Festival.
 Invited to the Cairo Film Festival for the children's film Aasmaan Se Gira.
 Produced and directed over 400 television commercials, including MRF Zigma, Colgate Fluriguard, Colgate Tartar Control, Kinetic Honda, Bajaj, Wheel, Forhans, Vicks, Jumpin' Mango, BPL, Richbru, Symphony Aircoolers, Nirlon, Erasmic, Birla White, Daewoo Corporate, Ashima Suitings, Pantaloon, Crystal Swimwear, Pan Parag, Jenson & Nicholson, White Eveready, Henkel Washing Powder, Dhara Vanaspati, Coca-Cola, Fanta, Limca, Kamasutra, Zandu Balm, Suzuki, CyberITmall.com, Nihilent Technologies, TCL Television and Hercules Cycle.
 Won the CAG and RAPA Awards for best TV commercial for Colgate Fluriguard
 Won the Ad Club Award for the White Eveready commercial
 Directed over 15 corporate documentaries, including the bid for 1988 Commonwealth Games at the Seoul Olympics for the Ministry of Sports, Government of India, Sahara Pariwar one hour corporate, TCS 30-minute profile for International clients.
 The first Indian director to use computer animation in films in 1986 for the titles in the movie Jalwa. Also directed the first Indian film to use virtual sets and computer-generated backdrops and weapons in the movie Rajkumar in 1996.
 Featured twice on BBC's Tomorrow's World for his use of computer animation in Indian feature films in 1997 and 1998.
 Created a variety of digital paintings and music that were featured in Innovation in Digital and Electronic Arts (IDEA), an international showcase for digital paintings and music in 2003 and 2004.
 Trained the Computer Graphics personnel at Tata Consultancy Services (TCS), Mumbai in film animation and computer graphics. 
 Directed Baba Films Productions' Tumko Na Bhool Payenge, starring Salman Khan, Sushmita Sen and Dia Mirza in 2001. The movie also celebrated its Silver Jubilee.
 Directed a 50-minute documentary on Shri Bhagawan Kalki, a globally recognised spiritual teacher from South India. 
 Directed a feature, Sab Gol Maal Hai, for the Children's Film Society of India (CFSI).
 Directed a spiritual feature film called Banaras: a mystic love story starring Urmila Matondkar, Dimple Kapadia, Raj Babbar, Naseeruddin Shah, Raj Babbar, Ashmit Patel. Invited to IFFI festival in Goa, selected for Indian panorama 2006.
 Produced and directed 'Karamchand 2006" for Sony TV.
 Recipient of National Award- Hindi Cinema Gaurav Samman at Vigyan Bhawan.

Art 
 Had exhibition of digital mixed–media paintings at Dusk art gallery. 
 Invited by Kala Academy Goa for a solo exhibition. 
 Invited for collective Ganesh art festival in Goa, Ruchika art gallery.
 Invited by the Nehru Center of Performing Arts, London to have a solo exhibition.
 The Marriott Mumbai is displaying three paintings done by Mr. Parashar.
 Taj Vivanta in Goa is displaying a collection Ganesha's done by Mr. Parashar.

Filmography

As Film Director
 Ab Ayega Mazaa (1984)
 Jalwa (1987)
 Peechha Karo (1986)
 ChaalBaaz (1989)
 Rajkumar (1996)
 Himalayputra (1997)
 Tumko Na Bhool Paayenge (2002)
 Meri Biwi Ka Jawab Nahin (2004)
 Inteqam: The Perfect Game (2004)
 Banaras (2006)
 Banarasi Jasoos (2016) (short film)
 Skin Of marble (2017) (short film)

Television
 Karamchand (1985)

As writer
 It Was Raining That Night (2005)

References

External links
 

20th-century Indian film directors
Hindi-language film directors
Living people
Indian television directors
Year of birth missing (living people)
Place of birth missing (living people)
Film and Television Institute of India alumni
21st-century Indian film directors